Le luci della centrale elettrica was the solo project of Italian singer-songwriter Vasco Brondi, created in 2007. After releasing the albums Canzoni da spiaggia deturpata (2008), Per ora noi la chiameremo felicità (2010), Costallazioni (2014) and Terra (2017), Brondi announced the project's disbandment in 2018, with the release of a compilation album followed by a farewall tour, which ended in Pesaro on 16 January 2018.

Writing for Rolling Stone Italia in 2019, Mattia Barro credited Le luci della centrale elettrica and the album Canzoni da spiaggia deturpata as a turning point in Italian alternative music, which brought indie to become "the new Italian pop music".
Canzoni da spiaggia deturpata received the 2008 Targa Tenco for Best Debut Album.
Le luci della centrale elettrica also collected three top ten records on the FIMI Italian Albums chart.

References

2007 establishments in Italy